Lieutenant General Henry Wase Whitfield (Chinese: 威非路) was the Lieutenant Governor of Hong Kong and Commander of British Troops in China, Hong Kong and the Straits Settlements.

Military career
Whitfield was commissioned into the 2nd West India Regiment in 1828. He went on to be commanding officer of his regiment in 1843 and commanded it for 15 years.

He was promoted to major-general in 1868 and appointed Commander of British Troops in China, Hong Kong and the Straits Settlements in 1869.

Memory
Whitfield Road (威非路道) in North Point and Whitfield Barracks in Tsim Sha Tsui, both in Hong Kong, were named after him.

References

|-

1814 births
1877 deaths
Commanders of Hong Kong
British Army generals
West India Regiment officers